Conflictos de un médico (English title: Conflicts of a doctor) is a Mexican telenovela produced by Ernesto Alonso for Televisa in 1980.

Cast 
Frank Moro 
Úrsula Prats
Miguel Manzano 
Olivia Bucio
Victoria Ruffo
Armando Coria 
Arturo Adonay 
Laura Garza
José Roberto
Miguel Macía
Erika Buenfil

References

External links 

Mexican telenovelas
1980 telenovelas
Televisa telenovelas
Spanish-language telenovelas
1980 Mexican television series debuts
1980 Mexican television series endings